William Alexander Berry (July 1882 – 1 March 1943) was an English footballer who played as a forward. Born in Sunderland, he played for Sunderland, Tottenham Hotspur, Manchester United and Stockport County.

References

External links
MUFCInfo.com profile

1882 births
1943 deaths
English footballers
Association football forwards
Sunderland Rovers F.C. players
Sunderland A.F.C. players
Manchester United F.C. players
Tottenham Hotspur F.C. players
Stockport County F.C. players
English Football League players